Charles James Hamilton (15 September 1855 – 19 December 1937) was a Conservative member of the House of Commons of Canada. He was born in Goderich, Canada West and became a physician.

He was elected to Parliament at the Stormont riding in the 1925 general election. After serving only one term, the 15th Canadian Parliament, he was defeated by Arnold Neilson Smith of the Liberals in the 1926 election.

Hamilton served as a reeve of Cornwall Township at one time. He was a municipal councillor for Cornwall, Ontario in 1884 and served as that city's mayor in 1889 and 1894.

References

External links
 

1855 births
1937 deaths
Physicians from Ontario
Conservative Party of Canada (1867–1942) MPs
Members of the House of Commons of Canada from Ontario
Ontario municipal councillors
Mayors of Cornwall, Ontario
People from Huron County, Ontario